The 1966 South Dakota Coyotes football team was an American football team that represented the University of South Dakota in the North Central Conference (NCC) during the 1966 NCAA College Division football season. In its first season under head coach Joe Salem, the team compiled a 5–5 record (2–4 against NCC opponents), finished in a three-way tie for fourth place out of seven teams in the NCC, and outscored opponents by a total of 225 to 160. The team played its home games at Inman Field in Vermillion, South Dakota.

Schedule

References

South Dakota
South Dakota Coyotes football seasons
South Dakota Coyotes football